Rudolf Rauch (16 April 1893 – 18 June 1964) was an Austrian sprinter. He competed in the men's 100 metres at the 1912 Summer Olympics.

References

External links
 

1893 births
1964 deaths
Athletes (track and field) at the 1912 Summer Olympics
Athletes (track and field) at the 1924 Summer Olympics
Austrian male sprinters
Olympic athletes of Austria
Athletes from Vienna